Benin City is the capital and largest city of Edo State, Nigeria. It is the fourth-largest city in Nigeria according to the 2006 census, after Lagos, Kano, and Ibadan, with a population estimate of about 1,500,000 as of 2016. Benin City is the centre of Nigeria's rubber industry, and oil production is also a significant industry.

The city was the most important settlement of the Edo Kingdom of Benin, which flourished during the 13th to the 19th century. It held important trade relations with Portugal during the last centuries before being captured, sacked and burnt in 1897 by a British punitive expedition. Many bronze sculptures in Benin City palace, collectively termed the Benin Bronzes, were stolen by the British who followed up their victory by gradually colonizing the area, eventually incorporating the region into Colonial Nigeria.

The indigenous people of Benin City are the Edo people (the Benin People), and they speak the Edo language or Bini Language. The people of the city have one of the richest dress cultures on the African continent and are known for their beads (the beads stand for royalty and usually stand out during the traditional marriage of the Benin people), body marks, bangles, anklets, raffia work and the subsistence farming of yam, plantain and cassava.

History

Edo people 
According to tradition, the original people and founders of the Ẹdo Empire and the Ẹdo people initially were ruled by the Oyo empire (Oduduwa grand son Oranmiya) dynasty who called their land Igodomigodo. Igodo, the first Ogiso, wielded much influence and gained popularity as a good ruler. He died after a long reign and was succeeded by Ere, his eldest son. A battle for power soon erupted between the wife of the last Ogiso and prince Ekaladerhan from Ife, son of the last Ogiso. Prince Ekaladerhan was framed by his father's wife and sentenced to death. The men sent to kill him, however, released him at Ughoton. The exiled prince made his way to where he changed his name to Izoduwa, meaning "I have found prosperity". It was during this period of confusion in Benin that the elders, led by Chief Oliha, mounted a search for the banished Prince Ekaladerhan – whom the Ife people now called Oduduwa.

The exiled Ekaladerhan, now Oduduwa, refused to come to Benin because of how he was treated, having found out that he wasn't killed. He devised to send one of his sons, Oramiyan. He refused to return from Ile-Ife but sent his son Ọranmiyan to become king in his place. Prince Ọranmiyan took up residence in the palace built for him at Uzama by the elders, now a coronation shrine. Soon after he married a beautiful lady, Ẹrinmwide, daughter of Osa-nego, the ninth Enogie of Egor. He and Erinmwide had a son. After some years he called a meeting of the people and renounced his office, remarking that the country was a land of vexation, Ile-Ibinu, and that only a child born, trained and educated in the arts and mysteries of the land could reign over the people. The country was afterward known by this name. He caused his son born to him by Ẹrinmwide to be made King in his place and returned to Benin land. After some years in Ife, he left for Benin, where he also left a son behind upon leaving, and his son Ajaka ultimately became the first Oba of Benin of the present line, while Ọranmiyan himself was reigning as Ọọni of Ifẹ. Therefore, Ọranmiyan of Ife, the father of Ẹwẹka I, the Ọba of Benin, was also the father of Ajaka, Alaafin of Ọyọ. Ọọni of Ifẹ. Allegedly Ọba Ẹwẹka later changed the name of the city of Ile-Binu, the capital of the Benin kingdom, to "Ubinu." This name would be reinterpreted by the Portuguese as "Benin" in their own language. Around 1470, Ẹwuare changed the name of the state to Ẹdo. This was about the time the people of Ọkpẹkpẹ migrated from Benin City. Alternatively, the Yoruba nation has a different conception of Oduduwa. According to Yoruba tradition, because of his power and military might, he was able to defeat the enemies invading Benin and that is why the people of Benin made him the King or Ọba of Benin. In any case, it is agreed upon by both the Yoruba and the Edo that Oduduwa sent his son Prince Oranmiyan of Ife to rule Benin City and founded the Oba dynasty in Benin City.

Benin imperialism was started in the last decade of the thirteen century by Oba Ewedo.

European contact and colonization 
The Portuguese visited Benin City around 1485. Benin grew rich during the 16th and 17th centuries due to trade within southern Nigeria, as well as through trade with Europeans, mostly in pepper and ivory. In the early 16th century, the Ọba sent an ambassador to Lisbon, and the King of Portugal sent Christian missionaries to Benin. Some residents of Benin could still speak a pidgin Portuguese in the late 19th century. Many Portuguese loan words can still be found today in the languages of the area. A Portuguese captain described the city in 1691:"Great Benin, where the king resides, is larger than Lisbon; all the streets run straight and as far as the eye can see. The houses are large, especially that of the king, which is richly decorated and has fine columns. The city is wealthy and industrious. It is so well governed that theft is unknown and the people live in such security that they have no doors to their houses". This was at a time when theft and murder were rife in London.

On 17 February 1897, Benin City fell to the British. In the "Punitive Expedition", a 1,200-strong British force, under the command of Admiral Sir Harry Rawson, captured, sacked, and burnt the city after all but two men from a previous British delegation led by Acting Consul General Philips were ambushed and killed. Alan Boisragon, one of the survivors of the Benin Massacre, included references of the practice of human sacrifice in the city in a firsthand account written in 1898 (one year after the Punitive Expedition). James D. Graham notes that although "there is little doubt that human sacrifices were an integral part of the Benin state religion from very early days," firsthand accounts regarding such acts often varied significantly, with some reporting them and others making no mention of them.

The "Benin Bronzes", portrait figures, busts and groups created in iron, carved ivory, and especially in brass (conventionally called "bronze"), were looted from the Benin City palace by the expeditionary force and are currently on display in various museums around the world. Some of the bronzes were auctioned off to compensate for the expenses incurred during the capture and occupation of the city. Most of these artifacts can be found today in Western museums and locations around the world. In recent years, various appeals have gone to various museums and governments to return such artifacts. The most prominent of these artifacts was the famous Queen Idia mask used as a mascot during the Second Festival of Arts Culture (FESTAC '77) held in Nigeria in 1977 now known as "Festac Mask".

The capture of Benin paved the way for British colonization and the merging of later regional British incorporation of African kingdoms into the Niger Coast Protectorate, the Protectorate of Southern Nigeria and finally, into the Colony and Protectorate of Nigeria. The British permitted the restoration of the Benin monarchy in 1914, but true political power still lay with the colonial administration of Nigeria.

Nigerian independence 
Following Nigeria's independence from British rule in 1960, Benin City became the capital of Mid-Western Region when the region was split from Western Region in June 1963. In 1976 when the region was renamed as Bendel State, it remained the capital of the region and became the State Capital of Edo State when Bendel state was split into Delta State and Edo State  in 1991.

Geography

Climate 
Benin City has a borderline tropical savanna climate (Köppen Aw) bordering upon a tropical monsoon climate (Am). The weather is uncomfortably hot and humid year-round, and generally very dull, especially between July and September.

Education
Benin City is home to some of Nigeria's institutions of higher learning, namely, the University of Benin located at Ugbowo and Ekenwan, the Ambrose Alli University located at Ekpoma, the College of Education Ekiadolor, Igbinedion University, the Benson Idahosa University,Wellspring University, Edo State Polytechnic located in Usen  (formerly known as Edo State Institute of Technology and Management Usen) and Edo State University, Uzairue.

Secondary schools in Benin such as, Edo College, Edo Boys High School (Adolo College), Western Boys High School, Oba Ewuare Grammar School, Greater Tomorrow Secondary School, Imaguero College, Oredo Girls Secondary School, Oredo, Garrick Memorial Secondary School, Winrose Secondary School, Asoro Grammar School, Eghosa Anglican Grammar School, Edokpolor Grammar School, Covenant Christian Academy, Niger College, Presentation National High School, Gaius Obaseki International High School, Immaculate Conception College (ICC), Uselu secondary school, Idia College, University of Benin Demonstration Secondary School (USSD), University Preparatory Secondary School, Auntie Maria School, Benin Technical College, Headquarters of Word of Faith Group of Schools, Lydia Group of Schools, Nosakhare Model Education Centre and Igbinedion Educational Center, Federal Government Girls College, Benin City, Paragon Comprehensive College, and Itohan Girls Grammar School, Negbenebor International School, Divine Wisdom School. Some of the vocational schools in Benin City include Micro International Training Center, Computer Technology and Training Center, Okunbor Group of Schools.

Environmental issues

Climate change 
The city is already feeling the effects of climate change, with increases in temperature, humidity and precipitation trends between 1981 and 2015.

Flood management 
Benin city experiences regular flooding. Studies have consistently highlighted the problem since at least 1993. Experts have recommended a number of ways to improve flood management, including better controls on land use, construction and development, improved Community-based programs designed to improve city adaptation and disaster management, and improvements in individual preparedness.

In June 2020, a significant number of communities and individuals were left homeless because of city flooding. At the time, residents and the city blamed poor storm drains and a failure to continue flood adaptation programs.

Urban heating 
The city, on average is .5 degrees Celsius warmer than the surrounding rural areas, and these temperature differences are greater during workweeks when human activity increases pollution in the urban area.

Waste management 
A 2021 study published in Nature, highlighted that the city has not met the standards for waste management set by the   Edo State Waste Management Board. After surveying 2720 inhabitants of the city, the authors found that most people in the city didn't understand proper waste management practices. Moreover, the study found that survey participants didn't understand how waste management was connected to other issues like greenhouse gas emissions. An additional study, found that most residents didn't understand the health impacts of bad waste management.

Culture
Attractions in the city includes the National Museum, the Oba Palace, Igun Street (Famous for bronze casting and other metal works). Other attractions include various festivals and the Benin Moats (measuring about 20 to 40 ft), the King's Square (known as Ring Road) and its traditional markets.

The Binis are known for bronze sculpture, its casting skills, and their arts and craft. Benin City is also the home of one of the oldest sustained monarchies in the world. Various festivals are held in Benin City yearly to celebrate various historic occasions and seasons. Igue festival is the most popular of the festivals where the Oba celebrates the history and culture of his people and blesses the land and the people. It is celebrated at a time between Christmas and New Year.

Festival 
Benin city has a popular festival called Igue festival. The festival is an annual event held in Benin to usher in the new year. The festival is an integral part of the culture of the people in Benin City (formerly referred to as Benin Kingdom or the Kingdom of Benin). The festival is believed to renew Oba Ewuare magical powers and it celebration comes between Christmas and New Year celebrations. The festival includes the Oba's blessing of the land and his people.

Aside the cultural festival, the city also play host to the Benin City Film Festival. The festival create room for the promotion of works produced by local film community. It also promote contents of National and International emerging filmmakers to showcase their works in an environment where they have access to experienced industry professionals.

Bini market days
The "Bini" people have four market days: Ekioba, Ekenaka, Agbado, and Eken.

Transportation
Benin Airport serves the city with three commercial airlines flying to it, including Arik Air, Air Peace and Azman.

Gallery

Notable people

 Godwin Abbe, former Nigerian Minister for Interior and Defence
 Ambrose Folorunsho Alli, former governor of the defunct Bendel State. He created the Bendel State University now named after him as "Ambrose Alli University"
 Eghosa Asemota Agbonifo, politician
 Anthony Anenih, chairman, the board of trustees (PDP) and Nigeria's former Minister of Works
Suleiman Braimoh (born 1989), Nigerian-American basketball player in the Israel Basketball Premier League
 Archbishop John Edokpolo, Minister of Trade and Founder of Edokpolor Grammar School
 Francis Edo-Osagie, businessman
 Jacob U. Egharevba, Bini historian and traditional chief
 Anthony Enahoro, anti-colonial and pro-democracy activist and politician
 Festus Ezeli, basketball player
 Abel Guobadia, former Chairman of Nigeria's Independent National Electoral Commission
Ovia Idah, Nigerian sculptor
 Benson Idahosa, Founder of Church of God Mission International Incorporated and Idahosa World Outreach (IWO)
 Felix Idubor, artist
 Felix Liberty, musician
 Gabriel Igbinedion, businessman and Esama of Benin kingdom
Divine Ikubor, known professionally as Rema, musician.
 Festus Iyayi, novelist and first African to win the Commonwealth Writers Prize
 Suleman Johnson, senior pastor and general overseer of Omega Fire Ministries International
Godwin Obaseki, the current governor of Edo State
 Samuel Ogbemudia, former governor of the Midwest region of Nigeria and later Bendel state
 Sonny Okosun, musician
 Suyi Davies Okungbowa, African fantasy and speculative fiction author
 Osasere Orumwense, former Vice-Chancellor of University of Benin
 Osayuki Godwin Oshodin, former Vice-Chancellor of University of Benin
 Demi Isaac Oviawe, Ireland-based actress
 Chris Oyakhilome, founder and president of Believers LoveWorld Incorporated, also known as Christ Embassy
 Modupe Ozolua, cosmetic surgeon
Lilian Salami, Vice-Chancellor of university of Benin
 Victor Uwaifo, musician

References

Bibliography
 Bondarenko D. M. A Homoarchic Alternative to the Homoarchic State: Benin Kingdom of the Thirteenth - Nineteenth Centuries. Social Evolution & History. 2005. vol. 4, no 2. pp. 18–88.

External links

WorldStatesmen- Nigeria
 The Fall of Benin]
Benin kingdom/Edo state tourism
Story of cities #5: Benin City, the mighty medieval capital now lost without trace

 
Populated places in Edo State
State capitals in Nigeria
Cities in Nigeria
Sacred sites in traditional African religions